The Men's 50m Backstroke event at the 2006 Central American and Caribbean Games occurred on Thursday, July 20, 2006, at the S.U. Pedro de Heredia Aquatic Complex in Cartagena, Colombia.

Records

Results

Final

Preliminaries

References

Men's 50 Back--Prelim results from the official website of the 2006 Central American and Caribbean Games; retrieved 2009-06-29.
Men's 50 Back--Final results from the official website of the 2006 Central American and Caribbean Games; retrieved 2009-06-29.

Backstroke, Men's 50m